The Jász-Nagykun-Szolnok County constituency no. 2 was one of the single member constituencies of the National Assembly, the national legislature of Hungary. The district was established in 1990, when the National Assembly was re-established with the end of the communist dictatorship. It was abolished in 2011.

Members
The constituency was first represented by Béla Mizsei of the Independent Smallholders, Agrarian Workers and Civic Party (FKgP) from 1990 to 1994. Imre Szekeres of the Hungarian Socialist Party (MSZP) was elected in 1994 and served until 2002. In the 2002 election, István Járvás of Fidesz was elected representative. Imre Szekres of the MSZP was re-elected in 2006 and served until 2010. In 2010 election followed by János Pócs of Fidesz.

Election result

1990 election

References

Jasz-Nagykun-Szolnok 2nd